Heroes All is a 1920 American World War I documentary film that was released by the American Red Cross.

Description
The film examines returning wounded World War I veterans and their treatment at Walter Reed Hospital, along with visits to iconic Washington, D.C., landmarks. The Red Cross Bureau of Pictures produced more than 100 films, including Heroes All, from 1917–1921, which are invaluable historical and visual records of the era with footage from World War I and its aftermath.

Several Red Cross cinematographers achieved notable film careers, including Ernest Schoedsack, later producer of Grass (1925), Chang (1927), and King Kong (1933), and A. Farciot Edouart, the latter becoming a special effects cinematographer for Paramount Pictures from the 1920s to the 1950s. According to Internet Movie Database, a sound version was prepared in 1931.

In 2009, Heroes All was named to the National Film Registry by the Library of Congress for being "culturally, historically or aesthetically" significant.

References

External links
Heroes All essay by Gerry Veeder, Ph.D. on the National Film Registry website 
Heroes All essay by Daniel Eagan in America's Film Legacy, 2009-2010: A Viewer's Guide to the 50 Landmark Movies Added To The National Film Registry in 2009-10, Bloomsbury Publishing USA, 2011,  pages 22–26 

1920 films
United States National Film Registry films
Documentary films about veterans
Films set on the United States home front during World War I
Western Front (World War I) films
International Red Cross and Red Crescent Movement
1920 documentary films
Black-and-white documentary films
American silent feature films
American black-and-white films
American documentary films
1920s American films
Silent war films